The Shyam Chak railway station in the Indian state of West Bengal, serves Shyam Chak, India in Paschim Medinipur district. It is on the Howrah–Kharagpur line.

History
Shyam Chak railway station is situated in Dhenga, Kharagpur, West Bengal. Station code is SMCK. It is a small railway station between Howrah and Kharagpur. Local EMU trains Howrah–Kharagpur local, Santragachi–Kharagpur local, Kharagpur–Howrah local, Kharagpur–Santragachi local stop here. The Howrah–Kharagpur line was opened in 1900. The Howrah–Kharagpur stretch has three lines. There is a plan to build a fourth line for the Santragachi–Panskura–Kharagpur stretch.
The Howrah–Kharagpur line was electrified in 1967–69.

References

External links
Trains at Shyam Chak

Railway stations in Paschim Medinipur district
Kolkata Suburban Railway stations